Tinea faciei is a fungal infection of the skin of the face. It generally appears as a photosensitive painless red rash with small bumps and a raised edge appearing to grow outwards, usually over eyebrows or one side of the face. It may feel wet or have some crusting, and overlying hairs may fall out easily. There may be a mild itch.

Treatment 
Most infections can be treated with topical antifungal medication. Rarely, more extensive or long-standing infections may require treatment with oral antifungals. The infection will still be contagious between 24 and 48 hours of the first treatment.

The ringworm should go away within 4–6 weeks after using effective treatment.

See also 
 Tinea corporis
 Antifungal drug
 List of cutaneous conditions

References

External links 

Animal fungal diseases
Mycosis-related cutaneous conditions